Ray Little (7 October 1914 – 28 April 1995) was an Australian cricketer. He played eight first-class matches for New South Wales between 1934/35 and 1935/36.

See also
 List of New South Wales representative cricketers

References

External links
 

1914 births
1995 deaths
Australian cricketers
New South Wales cricketers
Cricketers from New South Wales